Watshidimba "Patrick" Kabongo (born June 27, 1979) is a former professional Canadian football offensive lineman who played for 10 seasons in the Canadian Football League with the Edmonton Eskimos and BC Lions. He signed as a free agent with the Detroit Lions before joining the Ottawa Renegades practice roster. He then joined the Eskimos where he was part of their 93rd Grey Cup championship team in 2005. After his release from Edmonton in January 2012, he signed with the BC Lions on June 4, 2012. He also played defensive tackle for the University of Nebraska.

References

External links
BC Lions bio
Patrick Kabongo CFLPA profile
Detroit Lions bio

1979 births
Living people
American football defensive linemen
Canadian football offensive linemen
Canadian players of American football
Edmonton Elks players
BC Lions players
Nebraska Cornhuskers football players
Ottawa Renegades players
Sportspeople from Kinshasa